John Mather may refer to:

 John Mather (artist) (1848–1916), Australian landscape painter
 John Mather (academic) (fl. 1715-1748), English academic administrator at the University of Oxford
 John Mather (businessman) (1827–1907), Canadian pioneer in milling
 John Mather (cricketer) (1821–1870), Australian cricketer
 John B. Mather (c.1845–1892), Canadian businessman and politician
 John C. Mather (born 1946), American Nobel Prize–winning astrophysicist and cosmologist
 John C. Mather (New York politician) (1813–1882), American politician
 John N. Mather (1942–2017), American mathematician
 John Perkins Cushing Mather (1816–1891), American politician
 John T. Mather (1854–1928), American industrialist and philanthropist
 John Baxter Mather (1853–1940), Scottish-born journalist, newspaper proprietor, painter and art critic in South Australia

See also
 John Mathers (CSI), a fictional character in the TV series CSI: Crime Scene Investigation